The 2013 Green Party of Quebec leadership election took place September 21, 2013 in Quebec City, Quebec

Following the party's sagging fortunes in the 2012 campaign, including a public incident in which a journalist with the newspaper La Presse was able to secure candidacy with the party without vetting, incumbent Green Party leader Claude Sabourin resigned.

Registered candidates
Alex Tyrrell, candidate for Jacques-Cartier in the 2012 Quebec general election.
Patricia Domingos, mayor of Sainte-Justine-de-Newton.
Marc-André Beauchemin, candidate for the Action démocratique du Québec in La Pinière in the 2007 and 2008 Quebec general elections.
Pierre Étienne Loignon, party activist.

Potential candidates who did not enter
 Paul-André Martineau, 2010 candidate for leader.

Timeline

References

External links
 Green Party of Quebec website 

2013 elections in Canada
Quebec, 2013
2013 in Quebec
2013
Green Party of Quebec leadership election